The Piano Sonata No. 2 in B minor, Op. 61 by Dmitri Shostakovich, the last of his piano sonatas, was composed in early 1943. It was his first piano composition since the 24 Preludes, Op. 34 from 1933 and his second attempt at composing a piano sonata in the key of B-minor. John Jonas Gruen said that there was "nothing obscure or technically impenetrable" about this sonata, but that "something disquieting—something faintly obsessive—emerges from its deceptively simple structure."

Background
In the fall of 1942 Shostakovich and his family were living in the city of Kuybyshev, where they had been evacuated by the Soviet government in order to escape the Nazi siege of Leningrad. That October the composer learned about the death of his former piano professor Leonid Nikolayev, who had died in Tashkent earlier that month from typhoid fever. "I loved him greatly and it grieves me to think that I shall never see him again", Shostakovich wrote to his friend Isaak Glikman. "I have thought much about his life and shall miss him sorely."

In January 1943, Shostakovich commenced work on his second piano sonata, whose composition was concurrent with his waning enthusiasm for work on the opera The Gamblers as well as his own bout with typhoid fever. Initially, Shostakovich had envisioned a four-movement sonata in C-sharp minor. Three pages of rough drafts labeled "Piano Sonata No. 2, Op. 63" detailing this eventually abandoned concept are extant; none of this material was used in the final version of the sonata. Shostakovich continued to maintain in a letter to Vissarion Shebalin dated February 22 that the sonata would be cast into four movements. Soon thereafter, Shostakovich played the first movement of the final draft for Lev Oborin, who approved of the music, but suggested some edits which Shostakovich accepted. In a letter to Ivan Sollertinsky from March 1943, the composer claimed that the budding sonata was a symptom of his ongoing "graphomania" and that the score had been "nearly all" written down. A few weeks later on April 21, 1943, Shostakovich wrote to Glikman that he had just completed the Piano Sonata No. 2, which he dedicated to the memory of Nikolayev; he had completed the final draft of the sonata on March 17 while recovering his health at a sanatorium in Arkhangelskoye. Shostakovich premiered the sonata in Moscow on June 6, 1943, on the same program as the premiere of his Six Romances on Verses by British Poets. Efrem Flaks, who was Shostakovich's recital partner for the performance of the song cycle, remembered that the composer took unusual care in preparing his performance of the sonata; the concert was the first time he played the piano in public in Moscow since September 1942.

Music
The Piano Sonata No. 2 consists of three movements:

A typical performance takes approximately 25 minutes.

The restless mood of the first movement is established by the running sixteenth notes which begin the sonata, leading to a melodic line which is a verbatim quote in retrograde of the opening motif of Shostakovich's Symphony No. 1. This is followed by the appearance of a march-like theme in E-flat, accompanied by triads in the same key, before ebbing away into a chromatic closing subject. A fortissimo climax is capped by the combination of the movement's two main subjects, clashing against each other bitonally in B and E-flat. Following this is the "Largo" second movement, which mixes ternary and rondo forms. It has been likened to a waltz, as well as drawn commentary for its forecasting of the textures and moods of Shostakovich's late music. The finale begins with the statement of a thirty-measure theme which is then developed upon by nine variations; allusions to the compositions of Nikolayev, as well as to what would later become Shostakovich's musical monogram appear. The final variation closes the sonata with a recollection of its opening.

Reception
Writing nearly 40 years after the Piano Sonata No. 2's composition, Lev Danilevich eulogized it as a significant development in Shostakovich's piano writing, taking especial note of its "anti-virtuosic" austerity of texture. In the months immediately after the sonata's premiere, critical reactions to it were slow to appear in print; once they did, they were mostly muted. Glikman heard Pavel Serebryakov play the Piano Sonata No. 2 in the fall of 1943 in Moscow. Afterwards, he recalled that the music had made a "great impression" on him. Likewise, Sollertinsky wrote privately in a letter marked November 1, 1943, that the sonata was "likely one of [Shostakovich's] best works (far superior to the rest of his piano music)." Nevertheless in a letter to a friend dated June 14, 1944, Heinrich Neuhaus expressed mixed feelings:

Utmost mastery, novelty, intellect—empty for the soul and severe—clever and ancient—ancient sorrow consumes and oppresses. But like everything [Shostakovich] writes, it is unique of its kind and incomparable.

The Piano Sonata No. 2 was premiered in the United States and the United Kingdom in September 1943; Vera Brodskaya played the premiere stateside. A review by Henry Simond of that performance called the music "uncompromising, serious, crystal clear, unembellished, melodically and harmonically extremely typical of Shostakovich, who is not inclined to make musical jokes during wartime." A month later, the New York Times published a review which opined that the music was unsatisfying and that it did "not reflect any new facets of Shostakovich's personality." Another review in the World-Telegram sounded a much more encouraging appraisal of the sonata, saying that it "simply amazes you."

In 1947, the Finnish musicologist Erik Tawaststjerna heard Shostakovich play the sonata at that year's Prague Spring Festival:

When Shostakovich began performing the figurations in the first movement, I remembered the descriptions of Mozart's murmuring non legato. The descending third of the main theme [of the first movement] was interpreted by him with a restrained melancholy, the majestic octave theme being tinged with the color of steel. Shostakovich's playing is rooted in a symphonic concept... Until now, I have always perceived the "Andante" movement as being almost impressionistic. I was astounded by the sharpness of the thematic outlines in Shostakovich's interpretation. The melodic line [of the second movement] evolves in an endlessly subtle rubato. In the middle episode, one is amazed by his orchestral imagination—as if a solo flute, accompanied by lower strings, is heard playing... And, ultimately, the theme of the Finale [appears]—single voiced, without supporting chord. Even now I can hear how Shostakovich [played it], as if measuring the varying levels of interval intensity.

Also in attendance at that performance were Emil Gilels and David Oistrakh; although the latter noted that the performance was considered a success, the former confided to him that he did not think highly of the music. Nevertheless, Gilels declared in the press that the sonata was among the new "outstanding piano works" of the Soviet repertoire, but he also added that it "did not satisfy him" and that the sonata "testifie[d] more to Shostakovich's wonderful technique than to the depth of thought which was characteristic of his [recent] symphonies." His reservations notwithstanding, Gilels recorded the sonata for RCA Victor in 1965 and was considered an important exponent of it. Of Soviet pianists of the period, only Maria Yudina openly expressed her unreserved admiration for the sonata, which she immediately incorporated into her repertory. During the Zhdanovschina, the Piano Sonata No. 2 was among those works by Shostakovich which were censured by the Union of Soviet Composers.

Shostakovich's own feelings about the sonata fluctuated over the years. It was one of the few piano works from his artistic maturity which he did not record himself. In May 1943, shortly after Shostakovich completed the sonata, he met with Marietta Shaginyan, to whom he dismissed his newest work as a "trifle, something impromptu", and that he was "pulled" to wanting to write an Eighth Symphony instead. Shaginyan's own opinion was that the sonata was "somewhat dry" and "subdued"; Shostakovich later gifted her two autographed pages of the sonata. But in spring 1973, he told Inger Wikström during a meeting in Copenhagen that he esteemed the Piano Sonata No. 2 as the most important of his piano works.

References

Sources

Shostakovich
Compositions by Dmitri Shostakovich
1943 compositions
Compositions in B minor